Watson, also known as Mineral Springs, is an unincorporated community in Jefferson County, Alabama, United States. The community is bordered by Brookside on the north and west, by Birmingham and Gardendale on the east and by Birmingham on the south. A post office first opened in Watson in 1903.

References

Unincorporated communities in Jefferson County, Alabama
Unincorporated communities in Alabama